Kamasan is a village on Bali, Indonesia. It is situated just to the north of Gelgel, in the Klungkung regency. Kamasan has a cultural importance on a Bali-wide level. The various 'traditional' styles of painting on modern Bali are derived from the Kamasan style, which in turn takes it patterns from ancient Java. Historically, artists from Kamasan were used by the many raja courts that existed on Bali up to the early twentieth century. The village also provided gold- and silversmiths, dancers, musicians and puppeteers. The painters have a particular ward in Kamasan, the Banjar Sangging. The smiths are located in another ward, the Banjar Pande Mas.

See also

 Indonesian art
 Culture of Indonesia

References 

Populated places in Bali